Public Law 79-476 was passed by the 79th U.S. Congress in 1946. The Civil Air Patrol, the auxiliary of the United States Air Force, was to be "solely of a benevolent character". In other words, the Civil Air Patrol was to never participate in combat operations, nor to carry arms, sink submarines, or fight enemies from then on.

1946 in law
Civil Air Patrol
United States federal defense and national security legislation
79th United States Congress